The Campbellsville Historic Commercial District comprises a collection of about 20 buildings in downtown Campbellsville, Kentucky, a 200-year-old city. The district is listed on the National Register of Historic Places.

Location
The district is roughly bounded by Columbia Ave., Broadway, 1st, Hotchkiss Sts., Central Ave. (both sides), and railroad tracks.

Buildings
The most notable structure is Merchant Tower (circa 1910, 17,000 sq ft, 3-stories with tower, formally named Merchants Hotel). It is a standalone listing in the National Register of Historical Places.

Architecture
The 100 and 200 block of Main Street are lined with century old brick, stone, and iron buildings with Italianate architecture facades.  Merchant Tower was designed with Romanesque architecture.

Revitalization
In Campbellsville's historic district, the Main Street Manager oversees preservation and revitalization.  The Kentucky Heritage Council (Kentucky State Historic Preservation Office) is a valued source of information.

References

External links

 http://www.campbellsvilledowntown.com - Revitalization info.
 http://www.downtowncampbellsville.com - Downtown merchants.  Local merchant's website.
 http://www.merchanttower.com - Registered historic place within the district. Official site.
 https://web.archive.org/web/20090903020402/http://www.heritage.ky.gov/ - Kentucky Heritage Council.  Kentucky State Historic Preservation Office.

Italianate architecture in Kentucky
Neighborhoods in Kentucky
Campbellsville, Kentucky
Historic districts on the National Register of Historic Places in Kentucky
National Register of Historic Places in Taylor County, Kentucky
Commercial buildings on the National Register of Historic Places in Kentucky
Romanesque Revival architecture in Kentucky